The European Air Racing Championship is a handicapped air race arranged by the Royal Aero Club Records, Racing and Rally Association.

History
No sooner had aircraft developed to the stage that they would stay airborne for predictable amounts of time, than pilots had started to pit their skills and aircraft against each other both personally and on a national basis.

Schneider Trophy
Whilst the Schneider Trophy is probably the epitome of air racing involving the most technically advanced aircraft, it soon became obvious that, with so many different types in development, there would have to be some form of handicapping of aircraft to level the playing field.

King's Cup Race
The modern-day handicapped air race began in 1922 and was sponsored by King George V — called the King's Cup Race.  In 1931 the rules were re-written to allow for what might be termed amateur pilots to compete and those same rules still apply today.  The King’s Cup was the first and only air race to receive royal patronage.

Records Racing and Rally Association
Whilst this was a British phenomenon, the handicapping concept has been used to stage races worldwide. Especially popular in the technologically superior Europe, it became known through the Royal Aero Club Records Racing and Rally Association. This organisation runs an annual programme of 14 to 18 races at seven to nine different venues, mainly in the UK but at least two or three in Europe.

European Championship
In 2000, the organisation launched a European Championship aimed at attracting a wider audience of European competitors.  This championship is run within the Royal Aero Club RRR’s normal season of races but the champion is the pilot/navigator combination that scores the highest number of aggregate points over 6 races held at 3 different venues. These venues have included the UK, France, Spain, the Channel Isles, Ireland and the Isle of Man.

Winners

References

Air racing